Great Britain competed at the 2008 Summer Paralympics in Beijing, People's Republic of China. Great Britain sent a delegation of around 400, of which 212 were athletes, to compete in eighteen sports at the Games. The team was made up of athletes from the whole United Kingdom; athletes from Northern Ireland, who may elect to hold Irish citizenship under the pre-1999 article 2 of the Irish constitution, are able to be selected to represent either Great Britain or Ireland at the Paralympics. Additionally some British overseas territories compete separately from Britain in Paralympic competition.

Britain finished second in the medal table, behind host nation China, winning 42 gold medals and 102 total medals, equalling the team's position in the medal table at the 2004 Athens Games. The number of medals won was an increase on the 94 medals and 35 golds in Athens. The team was the most successful in two decades, with 80 different athletes winning at least one medal. The United Kingdom was the next host of the Summer Paralympics, holding the 2012 Games in London.

Disability classifications

Every participant at the Paralympics has their disability grouped into one of five disability categories; amputation, the condition may be congenital or sustained through injury or illness; cerebral palsy; wheelchair athletes, there is often overlap between this and other categories; visual impairment, including blindness; Les autres, any physical disability that does not fall strictly under one of the other categories, for example dwarfism or multiple sclerosis. Each Paralympic sport then has its own classifications, dependent upon the specific physical demands of competition. Events are given a code, made of numbers and letters, describing the type of event and classification of the athletes competing. Some sports, such as athletics, divide athletes by both the category and severity of their disabilities, other sports, for example swimming, group competitors from different categories together, the only separation being based on the severity of the disability.

Medallists

The following British competitors won medals at the games, all dates are September 2008. In the 'by discipline' sections below, medallists' names are in bold.

| width="78%" align="left" valign="top" |

| width="22%" align="left" valign="top" |

† Shelly Woods was initially awarded the silver medal in the athletics, women's 5000 m T54. However a re-run of the race was ordered by the International Paralympic Committee after the result was protested.

Multiple medallists

The following competitors won multiple medals at the 2008 Paralympic Games.

Targets
In July 2008, UK Sport, the body responsible for the distribution of National Lottery funding to elite sport, published its expectations for the Games. It identified a 112 "stretch" medal target and expected to win 95 of them, including around 35 gold medals to finish second in the medal table.

The athletes met the expectations of UK Sport for total medals, gold medals and medal table position, finishing second behind hosts China with 42 gold and 102 total medals. The medals claimed were not all ones that had been targeted, the team fell short of targets in some sports whilst it exceeded them in others; out of the fifteen sports set a target eight succeeded in meeting them.

Archery

Great Britain's archery squad for the Games included twelve athletes. In all, four archery medals, two gold, one silver and one bronze, were won by British archers, which meant that they finished second in the archery medal table. John Stubbs, a former England disabled cricketer, set a new world record score of 691 in the ranking round on the route to victory in the men's individual compound open. In the equivalent women's event Danielle Brown beat compatriot, and eventual bronze medallist, Mel Clarke before going on to win the gold.

Men

Women

Legend:

Athletics

The GB Paralympic team included thirty–five competitors in the sport of athletics, amongst them reigning champions Kenny Churchill, Danny Crates, Daniel Greaves and Stephen Miller. David Weir failed in his attempts to win five gold medals at the Games after suffering from a virus, but did win four medals; two gold, one silver, one bronze; before pulling out of his final event.

British participants were involved in a number of controversies regarding the reallocation of medals during the Games. Shelly Woods was initially awarded the silver medal in the women's 5000 m T54, but a rerun was ordered by the International Paralympic Committee (IPC) after the Australian, US and Swiss teams protested the result because six competitors were involved in a crash on the penultimate lap. When the race was rerun Woods won the bronze medal. David Weir believed he had won the gold medal in the men's 800 m T54 but a rerun of the race was ordered after it was discovered that the Australian silver medallist, Kurt Fearnley, had begun the race in the wrong lane. Following a letter from Fearnley and the Australian authorities to the IPC, which asked that the result not be overturned in the spirit of sportsmanship, the rerun was cancelled and Weir's medal reinstated. Discus thrower Rebecca Chin was originally awarded the silver medal in the women's F37–38, but her classification was challenged and Chin was deemed ineligible for the event, stripped of her medal, and her results were erased. The decision was particularly controversial given that Chin had already been assessed earlier in the Games whilst she competed in the women's F37–38 shot put final.

Men—Track

Men—Field

Women—Track

Women—Field

* Originally awarded the silver medal but stripped of medal and results following a challenge to her classification.

Key

DNS = Did not start
DNF = Did not finish
DQ = Disqualified
PR = Paralympic record

Q = Qualifiers for the final as decided on a basis of rank within heat
q = Qualifiers for the final as decided on a basis of fastest losers from all heats
WR = World record

Wheelchair basketball

Britain qualified teams in both the men's and women's events. The women's team finished eighth out of ten competing teams, whilst the men, matching their achievement at 2004 Athens Games, won the bronze medal.

Men

Pool B

Legend:         

Quarterfinal

Semi-final

Bronze medal final

Women

Pool B

Legend:         

Quarterfinal

5–8 Classification semi-final

7–8 Classification final

Boccia

Paralympic Boccia is open to players with cerebral palsy and other major physical disabilities. Four players were selected to compete at the Games, including Sydney gold medallist Nigel Murray. Murray advanced to the final where, despite at one stage taking a 3–1 lead, he was unable to beat Karen Hoi Ying Kwok and so won the silver medal. Murray was also a part of the four-person team that won the gold medal in the mixed BC1/BC2 event, beating the defending champions Portugal in the final.

Cycling

Great Britain's cycling team consisted of ten riders, including returning Paralympic gold medalists Aileen McGlynn, her tandem partner Ellen Hunter, and Darren Kenny. Former swimmers Jody Cundy and Sarah Storey were also named in the squad. The Paralympic cycling team, coached by Chris Furber and managed Helen Mortimer, trained alongside the British Olympic cycling team. Darren Kenny won five medals, four gold and one silver, more golds than any other British competitor at these Games. Cundy set a new world record and won two gold medals on the track to add to his five swimming medals from previous Games; this meant he matched Rebecca Romero's achievement in the Olympics of becoming a medal winner in two different sports. In all British cyclists won twenty medals, seventeen of them gold, to top the cycling medal tables for both road and track events.

Factor time

To ensure a fair event when athletes with differing disabilities compete, times achieved are sometimes modified by a percentage rate, to produce a result known as "Factor Time". It is this time that decides the result of the races, and is listed below. Where this differs from the actual time recorded, actual time is also listed.

Road

Key
AT = actual time
FT = factor time

Track

Men

Women

Key
OVL = Win by overtaking
Q = Qualified for next round
WR = World record

Equestrian

The only equestrian events held in the Paralympic Games are in the Dressage discipline. Seven British riders competed, in both individual and team events, winning five gold and five silver medals. Lee Pearson won three titles for the third successive Games, and Anne Dunham, at the age of 59, won her first individual Paralympic Games gold medal, having previously won three team golds and been a five–time world champion.

Wheelchair fencing

Lee Fawcett was the sole British fencer to qualify for the Games, he competed in both the foil and sabre B classification events. Fawcett was the final British athlete to compete in Beijing, losing his sabre round of 16 match to Serhiy Shenkevych of Ukraine.

Football five-a-side

The sport is classified as a B1 event, meaning that it is for blind athletes, however vision-impaired athletes are also able to take part as all competitors wear eyeshades to ensure they are equally disadvantaged. Goalkeepers may be sighted as long as they have not been registered with FIFA since 2003. Each team may also have a guide behind their opponents' goal to direct players.

Great Britain qualified through the International Blind Sports Federation European Championships, held in Greece in 2007, where the team won the silver medal. It was the first time Britain was represented in this sport at the Paralympics. The team finished fifth out of the six teams that competed, having beaten South Korea on penalties in the fifth and sixth place classification match.

Preliminaries

Legend:          

5–6 Classification

Football seven-a-side

7-a-side football is for people with cerebral palsy only, so athletes who classify as CP5-CP8 can take part in this sport, with C5 being most disabled. At least one C5 or C6 player, and no more than three C8 players, may be on the field at a given time. Britain qualified a team in this sport through the 7th-place finish of the England team at the CPISRA World Championships in Brazil.; their first appearance since the 1992 Barcelona Games

Pool B

Legend:          

5–8 Classification semi-final

7–8 Classification final

Judo

Four British judokas qualified for the Games, all events were for visually impaired athletes. A single medal was won, by Sam Ingram, in the men's 90 kg category.

WDL Withdrawal

Powerlifting

Four British powerlifters qualified to compete at the Games. Jason Irving and Natalie Blake had the best results, each finishing sixth, Blake was competing in the −48 kg division, having dropped down two weight categories since her fourth-place finish in Athens.

Rowing

Rowing appeared as a Paralympic sport for the first time at the 2008 games. Briton Helene Raynsford became the first ever Paralympic champion in the sport, winning the women's single sculls. Tom Aggar matched her success with victory in the men's single sculls. A bronze medal for the mixed coxed four crew meant that GB won more medals in the sport than any other nation and topped the rowing medal table.

Key
Q = Qualified for final
R = Qualified for repechage
WB = World best time

Wheelchair rugby

At the Paralympics teams in the sport of wheelchair rugby are made up of mixed classification tetraplegic athletes of both sexes. Great Britain qualified via the Europe Zonal Championship and went on to finish fourth out of eight teams, losing the bronze medal playoff to Canada.

Pool B

Sailing

Great Britain entered crews in all three of the sailing events, held in the Qingdao International Sailing Centre. All three boats finished in the top ten places of their events, but none were in the medal positions.

Key
(#) = Worst two results discarded
CAN = Race cancelled

Shooting

British shooters won a single medal at the Games, a gold for Matt Skelhon in the mixed R3–10 m air rifle prone SH1. With his first six shots in the qualification round he equalled the world record with a perfect score of 600 out of 600. Of the other six events in which there was a British competitor only Nathan Milgate, in the men's R1-10 m air rifle standing SH1, advanced to the final.
Rifle

Swimming

British Swimming selected a squad of 35 athletes to send to Beijing to compete in the swimming events. The team contributed a total of forty-one medals to the ParalympicsGB medal total – eleven gold, twelve silver and eighteen bronze. David Roberts won gold in each of his three individual and one of his relay events, taking his personal Paralympics gold medal haul to eleven, equalling that of Dame Tanni Grey-Thompson. Heather Frederiksen won four medals, including gold in the 100 m backstroke S8 where she set a new world record time, and Matt Walker, competing in his third Paralympics, won four individual silver and bronze medals and a gold in the 4 × 100 m freestyle relay, whilst James Anderson competed in his fifth Paralympics, taking his individual medal total to 17. Thirteen-year-old Eleanor Simmonds, the youngest of all the British athletes in Beijing, won two gold medals, making her Britains youngest ever individual Paralympic medallist.

Men

Legend:    

Women

Legend:

Table tennis

Eleven table tennis players were selected for the GB Paralympic squad. Included in the squad was 50-year-old Dzaier Neil who had previously taken part in the 1984 Los Angeles Games before taking a ten-year break from the sport. In the individual events only Neil Robertson progressed as far as the round of 16 whilst the four teams entered won a total of just two matches between them. The squad therefore failed to win any of the four medals that were targeted by UK Sport.

Men

Women

Wheelchair tennis

Team Paralympic GB had competitors in four of the six wheelchair tennis disciplines; men's, women's and mixed quads singles and mixed quad doubles. Peter Norfolk, nicknamed the 'Quadfather', won gold in the mixed quad singles, successfully defending the title he had won in Athens.

Media coverage
As with the 2008 Summer Olympics, the BBC aired coverage of the Games in the UK. The Games were broadcast in high-definition for the first time. BBC Red Button and bbc.co.uk showed live coverage throughout the Games, with a nightly highlights programme on BBC Two (simulcast on BBC HD), anchored by Clare Balding and Steve Cram. Live coverage was also shown on BBC One, BBC Two, and BBC HD on Saturdays and Sundays. Both the opening and closing ceremonies were broadcast live. Radio coverage was provided by BBC Radio 5 Live.

See also
Great Britain at the Paralympics
Great Britain at the 2008 Summer Olympics

Notes

External links
Beijing 2008 Paralympic Games Official Site
International Paralympic Committee
British Paralympic Association
"Where will Paralympic medals be won?", BBC, 4 September 2008
"Paralympic challengers", BBC, 6 September 2008

Nations at the 2008 Summer Paralympics
2008
Paralympics